Howmeh or Humeh may refer to:
 Humeh, Isfahan
 Howmeh, Kerman
 Humeh, Lorestan
 Howmeh District
 Howmeh Rural District (disambiguation)